Louisiana Highway 109 (LA 109) is a state highway located in southwestern Louisiana that runs  in a north–south direction from U.S. Highway 90 (US 90) and LA 3112 southwest of Vinton to LA 27 at Juanita, a point north of DeQuincy.  A largely rural route, LA 109 parallels the Texas–Louisiana border and passes through the community of Starks in Calcasieu Parish where it intersects LA 12.  The southern terminus of LA 109 is located just north of I-10 (Exit 4) between Orange, Texas and Vinton, Louisiana.

Route description
From the south, LA 109 begins at an intersection with US 90 and LA 3112 in Toomey, southwest of Vinton. From this four-way intersection, US 90 heads east toward Vinton and south a short distance to I-10 (Exit 4), at which point the two highways proceed west in a concurrency across the state line into Orange, Texas. Here LA 109 crosses the Kansas City Southern Railway (KCS) tracks and intersects LA 12 a short distance later. LA 12 heads into Texas on the west and DeQuincy on the northeast.

After , LA 109 curves to the northeast and travels another  to a point known as Fields.  Here LA 109 intersects LA 389, which connects to US 190 in Merryville on the northwest and LA 12 in DeQuincy on the southeast.  From this intersection, LA 109 and LA 389 turn to the east, engaging in a brief wrong-way concurrency (though directional banners are not used here) before LA 109 turns off again to the northeast.  During its final , LA 109 passes through a point known as Mystic and reaches its northern terminus at an intersection with LA 27 at Juanita.  LA 27 heads through Singer to DeRidder on the north and through DeQuincy to Lake Charles on the south.

LA 109 is an undivided, two-lane highway for its entire length.

History
In the original Louisiana Highway system in use between 1921 and 1955, the modern LA 109 made up parts of several routes, including State Route 121 from the southern terminus at Toomey to Starks; State Route 143 from Starks to Beauregard Parish Road 441 (PR 441); and State Route 287 from there to the northern terminus at Juanita.

LA 109 was created with the 1955 Louisiana Highway renumbering, and its route has remained unchanged to the present day.

Major intersections

References

External links

La DOTD State, District, and Parish Maps

0109
Transportation in Calcasieu Parish, Louisiana
Transportation in Beauregard Parish, Louisiana